The 2016–2017 Israel Football League season was the tenth season of the Israel Football League (IFL). The fields were enlarged to 80 yards and the games were now played with nine player teams. The season concluded with the Jerusalem Lions defeating the Tel Aviv Pioneers in Israel Bowl X.

Regular season 
The regular season consisted of 10 games for each team, with two games (home and away) against each team within their division and one game against each of the other teams.

Playoffs

Wild Card games 

 Rebels 36 – 14 Hammers

 Pioneers 68 – 40 Black Swarm

Division Championships 

 Lions 48 – 40 Rebels

 Troopers 32 – 44 Pioneers

Israel Bowl X 
Lions 44 – 36 PioneersThe Lions made a last minute comeback and then won in overtime.

References

Israel Football League Seasons